Buckie is a burgh town (defined as such in 1888) on the Moray Firth coast of Scotland. Historically in Banffshire, Buckie was the largest town in the county until the administrative area was abolished in 1975. The town is the third largest in the Moray council area after Elgin and Forres and within the definitions of statistics published by the General Register Office for Scotland was ranked at number 75 in the list of population estimates for settlements in Scotland mid-year 2006.

Etymology
The origin of the name of the town is not entirely clear. Although the folk etymology is that Buckie is named after a seashell (genus buccinum) the reality is that the shared marine background is a coincidence. The name Buckie would not have originally identified a place immediately adjacent to the sea, so alternative etymological sources are more likely. Unfortunately, in one of the earlier books on Scottish place names, Buckie on the Moray Firth does not receive a mention. However, a Buckie in the Balquhidder district of Perthshire is described as being derived from the Gaelic word boc or Welsh bowk, both meaning a buck or male deer. This suggests the meaning of Buckie as place where male deer gather, most likely referring to the valley of what is known today as the Buckie Burn.

History

A 1936 article by a Dr Cramond discusses the earliest mention of Buckie dating from 1362, when the lands of Rove Bucky in le Awne were leased by John Hay to John Young, vicar of Fordyce. The Hays, from whom the Rannes family were descended, had acquired through Royal favour a footing in the district at a still earlier age when the greater part from the Deveron to the Spey was embraced in the Forest of Awne or Ainie (now Enzie) and the Boyne. Rove Bucky is far from understandable and could be a scribe's error and should perhaps read Over Bucky as occurs in older title deeds, in distinction to Nether Buckie. It has been spelt in different ways, Robert Burns called it Bucky in his poem Lady Onlie - Lady Lucky. This was the form at the end of the 18th century.

Robert Gordon's map Aberdeen, Banf, Murrey &c. to Inverness: [and] Fra the north water to Ross, which is dated at some time between 1636 and 1652, shows Buckie in its own right as a community some small distance from the coast with the community of Freuchny sitting nearer the shore to the north. Robert Gordon and Joan Blaeu's Duo Vicecomitatus Aberdonia & Banfia, una cum Regionibus & terrarum tractibus sub iis comprehensis published in Amsterdam 1654 clearly shows Buckie and Freuchny with the addition of Nether Buckie. James Robertson's Topographical and military map of the counties of Aberdeen, Banff and Kincardine, London, 1822 seems geographically inaccurate in its relative positioning of Buckie, Nether Buckie and Freuchny, but is significant in that the new label of Rotten Slough is given equal importance in terms of size of community with Buckie; however, in Thomson’s Atlas of Scotland, Edinburgh, 1832 Rotten Slough is fairly unimportant by size so one of these two reference publications is distorted, probably the former. This community, which would later come to be known as Portessie, was reportedly formed when "Porteasie.....became a fishing station in 1727, when 5 houses were built by the proprietor of Rannes for the accommodation of the original fishers from Findhorn" and the 1731 Rathven Session Minutes shows that Rotten Slough already has a population of 40 with ten households and subsequent minutes show the community growing until the 1791 entry records 177 souls in 44 households.

By the time of the publication of the 1891 First Series Ordnance Survey Map of Elgin, which reflects the 1866-1870 survey, Buckie has developed markedly with areas named Seatown, Newtown, Ianstown and Portessie. The 19th century OS Six Inch series further shows Gordonsburgh, Craig Bow and Strathlene. The 1910 OS 3rd Edition one-inch map of Elgin has settled on the name of Ianstown and all other parts of Buckie are named as they are known today but then, just to confuse the issue, the Bartholomew Survey Atlas of Scotland, Edinburgh, 1912 uses the label Ianston. The conflicting nomenclature continued with the issue of the 1929 OS One-inch Popular edition and the 1933 JG Bartholomew & Son, Half-inch to the Mile maps of Scotland.

Layout today
Geographically, the town is, broadly speaking, laid out in a linear fashion, following the coastline. There is a lower shore area and an upper area. Fundamentally Buckie itself is the central part of the community lying between the Victoria Bridge under which flows the Buckie Burn at the western end of West Church Street, the eastern end of Cluny Harbour and above the shore area. To the west of Victoria Bridge and the Buckie Burn is Buckpool, which was formerly known as Nether Buckie, and on the shoreline, west of Cluny Harbour, between Baron Street and the Buckie Burn mouth, there is the Yardie. Immediately above the Yardie on the Buckie side of the burn is the Seatown. To the west of the Yardie is Harbourhead. To the east of Cluny Harbour lie Ianstown, Gordonsburgh and Portessie also known locally as The Sloch (historically The Rotten Slough), which reaches towards Strathlene. These communities were, to all intents and purposes, separate fishing settlements that gradually merged over the course of time. A new town was laid out above the shoreline in the 19th century and this is the rump of Buckie.

Population and demography
The 2011 UK Census reported that, from Buckie's total population, 88.7% were born in Scotland with the largest single minority being those born in England (7.5%). In terms of declared ethnic allegiance the largest was "White Scottish", at 90.5%.

Source: https://www.scotlandscensus.gov.uk/ Scotland's Census, 2011 Census data

Politics

National governments
Buckie is in the Moray (Westminster) constituency of the UK Parliament, which returned the Scottish Conservative Douglas Ross as its Member of Parliament (MP) in 2019, after winning the seat in 2017. 

Buckie is in the Banffshire and Buchan Coast constituency of the Scottish Parliament. The seat was represented by SNP MSP Stewart Stevenson from 2011 until 2021 and by SNP MSP Karen Adam since the Scottish Parliament election of 2021. The constituency is also part of the North East Scotland electoral region.

Local government

Following the reorganisation of local government in Scotland, Buckie now has 1 multi-member ward with 3 councillors.

Additionally, there is the Buckie Community Council, which allows for 12 members to be elected or co-opted.

Transport

Road
Buckie is situated near the A98 primary road, which connects Fraserburgh with Fochabers at the junction of the A96. The A98 runs east–west, approximately parallel with the southern edge of Buckie. The A942 starts at "The Toll Bar" and runs due north from the A98 into Buckie becoming High Street and then North High Street before swinging east as Low Street, along the harbour as Commercial Road and onwards as Rathburn Street, Reidhaven Street and finally Great Eastern Road out of town towards Findochty and Portknockie. Where the A942 swings east, the A990 commences to the west and heads past The Yardie and onwards as Main Street and then Great Western Road towards Portgordon. The nearest railway station is at Keith serving the Aberdeen-Inverness line. Bus services operate to Aberdeen, Macduff and Elgin. There was a connecting service to Keith railway station, which was synchronised with rail times but the service was withdrawn when Moray Council funding ceased in late September 2013. Local bus services are operated by Stagecoach.

Golden Age of the Railway
Historically, Buckie had extensive rail connections with the rest of North East Scotland. The Great North of Scotland Railway was laid out in the 1850s and served the Aberdeen to Inverness route until it was decommissioned in the late 1960s. This construction did not reach the coast until Nairn and various branch lines were built to link the peripheral areas to the mainline service.

In 1923, GNSR was absorbed into the London and North Eastern Railway before that itself was nationalised along with all other UK rail services into British Rail in 1948.

The Moray Coast Railway was also constructed by GNSR and the part of it that served Buckie, opening in 1886, ran from Cairnie near Keith down to the coast at Portsoy and then swung west through Cullen, Portknockie and Findochty reaching its first stop in Buckie at Portessie. This station was built directly on top of the cliff and commanded panoramic views over the Strathlene House Hotel, Strathlene outdoor swimming pool and beach and onward to the offshore rocks of Craigenroan and the Moray Firth. Indeed, a footpath led from the station down to the hotel and beach area and a visit to Strathlene was a popular day out by train before and during World War II. In 1936 Buckie Town Council proposed to change the name of the station to Strathlene but LNER declined suggesting instead that the Town Council erect their own large sign on Strathlene Golf Course that could be seen from the train. A retired passenger carriage was available for rent at the station.  to the west was Buckie Station, which was located below the cliff and virtually across the street from Buckie Fish Market. To reach Buckie Station the railway gently descended to the west from the heights of Portessie on an embankment to the foot of the cliff whilst the parallel road lying adjacent to the track on its southern flank rose to the west up the McLaren's Brae end of East Church Street to the town centre.  further west stood Buckpool Station and from there the line continued due west to Portgordon and onward to Spey Bay before crossing the River Spey and swinging inland to rejoin the mainline service at Elgin. Buckie was served by these three railway stations until 1968 when the line was finally closed.

It is possible to walk, or cycle along the route of the old railway from Cullen to Garmouth. This walk takes in the magnificent Cullen viaduct from which fine views of that town can be had and, at the other end, the Spey Bridge.

Portessie was also terminus to the Buckie and Portessie Branch of the Highland Railway. This line was opened in 1884 and provided a direct rail link "up the hill" to Keith. The line ran westwards from Portessie but remained on top of the cliff, passing the Pot O' Linn, skirting the rear of Cliff Terrace and crossing Harbour Street then swinging south contributing to the curve of Mill Crescent to stop at Buckie Highland Station before continuing up present day Millbank Terrace towards Rathven. Until recent years this latter section was used as a footpath and commonly known as "The Highland Line" – it was quite possible to cycle from Millbank Terrace to the site of Rathven Station as late as the 1970s and even early 1980s – but housing development and farming interests have contributed to the virtual closure of this popular route to Peter Fair Park. The line passed under a road bridge of what is now the A98, which has long since been demolished, and then turned westwards again towards Drybridge and made another sweep to the south as it passed Enzie and then headed uphill, over the Enzie Braes, to Aultmore and on to Keith. This link was relatively short-lived and was closed in 1915 except for a freight service between Buckie and Portessie, which was closed in 1944.

As a port
Cluny Harbour has long been the industrial centre of Buckie. This port was built by the Cluny family in 1877 to replace the town's first stone harbour in Nether Buckie, which was constructed in 1857  or so to the west but had a tendency to silt up and become unusable. The Laird of Letterfourie had contributed £5,000 of the construction costs at Nether Buckie but the main investor with the balance of £10,000 was the Board of Fisheries. The engineers were D.& T. Stevenson of Edinburgh, the family firm of the author Robert Louis Stevenson. It was and remains a very sturdily built edifice with the main walls of considerable thickness being built of quartzite, quarried locally at Strathlene, capped with a very hard type of sandstone, which was also used to form the walls at the entrance and of the harbour proper. As regards stability the harbour has remained a monument to engineering science with very little maintenance ever being necessary. It had a design fault, however, in that the entrance opened to the north east and was subject to infill with shingle, moving westwards by longshore drift. Later known as Buckpool Harbour, this earlier port became something of an eyesore and eventually the silted basin became overgrown and dangerously swampy. The decision was taken to fill in the basin and this work was undertaken in the 1970s. The resulting park includes a pebble beach and the original quartzite harbour walls remain completely intact.

Industry
Once a thriving fishing and shipbuilding port, these industries have declined. Though Peterhead and Aberdeen are now more often associated with the fishing industry in northeast Scotland, in 1913 Buckie had the largest steam drifter fleet in Scotland. Food processing remains important, with large fish factories and smoke houses found around the harbour. Buckie can properly be regarded as one of the main points of origin of the modern Scottish shellfish industry. A Mancunian, Charles Eckersley, who moved to Buckie in the 1950s and started trading as a fish merchant, noticed that many of the varieties of shellfish that were regarded as economically useless by Buckie fishing vessels (prawns, scallops etc.) were in fact the same species that he had enjoyed whilst completing his National Service in Palestine. He seized the opportunity to exploit this gap in the market and he built a thriving processing and packing business, which eventually expanded to include factories as far afield as Barcelona and Alicante in Spain.

The Buckie Shipyard now repairs and refits RNLI lifeboats for much of the United Kingdom and operates service contracts for various other clients including the MoD as well as building new vessels but boatbuilding was a major industry in the town for decades. Until recent years there were three quite separate boatyards building traditional wooden clinker fishing vessels. Leaving Cluny Square and heading down North High Street, also locally known as the Bowling Green Brae, the view of the sea would have been interrupted by a huge grey corrugated iron shed. This was Thomsons and vessels were launched directly into the Moray Firth from a slipway. Heading east to Cluny Harbour it would have been impossible to miss Herd and Mackenzie on the fourth or lifeboat basin of the harbour. Directly behind their large sheds and across Blantyre Terrace was Jones with their private harbour into which they launched their vessels. Thomsons is gone but the premises of Herd and McKenzie and Jones are part of the modern day Buckie Shipyard. It was Herd and McKenzie, a firm with its roots in Dunbartonshire from where Messrs Herd and Mackenzie sortied north, which built and launched the training schooner Captain Scott in 1972. At the time of its launch, this vessel was the largest of its type in the world. In earlier years, there were further boat construction operations dotted along the shoreline from The Yardie to Ianstown and on to Portessie but these had mostly been amalgamated into the three main firms or had gone out of business by the interwar period.

A significant part of the population works in the offshore oil industry although Buckie somewhat missed the boat with the North Sea boom. In the late 1970s, there were extensive plans drawn up to extend Cluny Harbour out to the Mucks reef with the intention of serving oilfield supply vessels. Nothing came of this but every now and then the idea rears its head once more to be met with great enthusiasm before failing to get off the ground again.

Buckie was home to a specialist electric lamp factory of Thorn EMI until 1987 when it was closed and production moved to a new plant in Leicestershire. All of the predominantly female staff were offered jobs at the new facility in the East Midlands but, as the vast majority of the labour force were second wage earners in families, this offer was almost universally rejected.

Buckie is home to the Inchgower Distillery, which sits  or so inland from the town and is best known for the Inchgower Single Malt.

Religion

As a traditional fishing community, Buckie has always had an active religious life, and thus has numerous churches representing almost every branch of Northern European Christianity. The largest church is St. Peter's, which stands on St. Andrews Square in Buckpool. This twin-spired red sandstone construction was originally planned to act as the cathedral for the Roman Catholic Diocese of Aberdeen when it was opened in 1857. This never came to pass and Buckie was left with what is arguably one of the grandest churches in NE Scotland outside of Aberdeen. The basis of this reasoning was that the Roman Catholic population per capita in the area around Buckie was one of the highest in post-Reformation Scotland. St. Gregory's, built at Preshome near Buckie in 1788, was the first post-Reformation church to be built in Scotland that looked like a church – prior to that date post-Reformation Roman Catholics worshiped in clandestine churches designed to look anonymous.

The largest Church of Scotland congregation in the town worships in the North Church in Cluny Square. This building houses the town clock and was opened in 1879. There are other Church of Scotland congregations in addition to Methodist, Salvation Army, Episcopal, Baptist, Gospel Hall Brethren and other congregational churches.

Schools
Buckie High School is located on West Cathcart Street. Directly opposite from the original and still functioning old building of the school is Cluny Primary School (Buckie Primary School until 1974.) Examination results are in line with those of young people with similar needs and backgrounds in other schools across Scotland.

There are three further primary schools in the town - Millbank Primary School on McWilliam Crescent in the newer mid-southern part of Buckie, St. Peter's RC Primary School in Buckpool and Portessie Primary School. Additional primary schools in Portgordon, Findochty, Portknockie and Cullen contribute to the roll of Buckie High School. The small communities of Arradoul, Drybridge, Rathven and Lintmill, none of which support their own schools any longer, also contribute to the BHS roll along with the families of the many farms scattered locally. The adjoining school areas are Banff, Keith and Fochabers.

Leisure
Like other towns in the area, Buckie is well served by golf courses, with clubs at the eastern and western peripheries. To the eastern extremity with a spectacular clifftop location lies Strathlene Golf Course, which stretches almost all the way to the village of Findochty; while to the west, also on a clifftop, lies Buckpool Golf Club, which reaches towards the village of Portgordon.

Adjacent to Buckie High School is Victoria Park, home of Buckie Thistle Football Club. Although The Jags had been consistently high finishers in the Highland Football League, the league title had eluded the club since 1958. The long wait ended on 1 May 2010 when an away win at Wick Academy F.C. sealed a first championship in 52 years. The championship was retained in May 2011 by a 2–1 victory over nearest rivals Deveronvale in the last match of the season, with Buckie scoring the winner in the final minute. The 1950s was a decade when all trophies available were regularly won. During this era Buckie Thistle travelled to Hampden Park to meet Queen's Park in a Scottish Cup 4th round replay on 30 October 1954, winning 2–1, becoming the first and, to this day, only senior non-league club to have won a competitive match at the national stadium. The board has developed the stadium in recent years, adding a function hall within the ground so that sponsors and match-goers can enjoy licensed and catering facilities pre- and post-match. 

In Buckpool, next door to Buckpool Golf Club, is the Merson Park home of Buckie Rovers Football Club. The Rovers are members of the Scottish Junior Football Association and play in that body's North First Division (East). At one time they played at Victoria Park, alternating home fixtures with their senior cousins but when Buckie Thistle were suffering an episode of extreme financial distress the decision was taken to move to a new facility at the municipal Merson Park. The Merson Park ground has only a perimeter fence and dugouts differentiating it from a municipal pitch and there are no covered or seated facilities at all.

Near the southern edge of town on High Street lies Linzee Gordon Park. This is home to Buckie Cricket Club Buckie Cricket Club Online 2008, which has a very long history with numerous Macallan North of Scotland Cricket Association League NoSCA - North of Scotland Cricket Association titles (having last topped the league in 2018) on top of various league and cup wins in the 1990s including two wins in the prestigious Scottish Cricket Union Small Clubs Cup, specifically in 1995 and 1997. BCC built a modern pavilion to replace their aging home, which opened in June 1998. The construction was partly funded by sportscotland and the National Lottery. Linzee Gordon Park also has a municipal pavilion along with adjoining pitch for football use. Additionally, for some of the year, the football pitch at Linzee Gordon Park had been converted to become a rugby pitch where Buckie RFC trained and played home games although the club ceased operations as of 28 May 2011 due to lack of interest.

Bowling is a popular pastime in Buckie and the town boasts two greens. Buckie Bowling Club is on North High Street and Low Street with views over the Moray Firth from the clubhouse. Victoria Bowling Club sits on West Church Street adjacent to Victoria Bridge and the Buckie Burn flowing below.

Buckie has a 25m swimming pool, which was built next to Buckie High School and opened in 1975.

Buckie is at the end of the Speyside Way long-distance footpath. There is magnificent coastal scenery all along the Banff coast, with easy access to areas such as Glenlivet, Speyside and the Cairngorms.

Notable people 
 George Henry Bennett, brewer and politician, of Richmond, Victoria, Australia, 1850-1908
 John Garden Scottish International footballer, 1904-1996
 Alexander Hutchison, poet
 Alex Jappy, accordionist
 Avril Mair, fashion journalist and editor
 Colin Mark, lexicographer and writer in Scottish Gaelic 
 George McIntosh, Victoria Cross recipient
 Billy Milne, soldier and football player
 Trond Mohn, Norwegian businessman and philanthropist
 Malcolm Slater, football player
Jennifer Smith, FRSE sociolinguist studies Scottish dialect
 Isla St Clair, singer
 Alex Wilson, football player

In popular culture 
Stephen King mentioned the Buckie Thistle Football club in his novel If It Bleeds.

References

External links

 Buckie & District Fishing Heritage Centre
 1st Buckie Company Boys' Brigade - Largest UK company
 Buckie & District Pipe Band
 [A website with many Buckie stories

 
Towns in Moray
Ports and harbours of Scotland
Fishing communities in Scotland
Populated coastal places in Scotland